Mordellistena bolognai is a beetle in the genus Mordellistena of the family Mordellidae. It was described in 1990 by Marianne Horak.

References

bolognai
Beetles described in 1990